The fishing industry in Wales is a sector of the Welsh economy.

History 
Fisherman in Monmouthshire have fished using lave nets in the Severn Estuary since the 17th-century.

Overview 

Notes

References 

Economy of Wales
Fishing in Wales
Food processing industry in the United Kingdom